E. J. Eames (Elizabeth Jessup; pen name Stella and Mrs. E. J. Eames; June 26, 1813 – November 1856) was a 19th-century American writer of prose and poetry. She was a regular contributor to Horace Greeley's New Yorker for some years before her marriage (under the signature of "Stella"); and thereafter, her writings frequently appeared in Graham's Magazine, the Southern Literary Messenger, and later still, in The Columbian.

Early life
Elizabeth Jessup was born in Schodack, New York on June 26, 1813. Her father, Isaac Jessup (d. 1853, was a Deacon and served as County Treasurer of Will County, Illinois. Her siblings included brothers, and a sister, Sarah (d. 1863). Until age 17, Eames lived in a secluded village on the banks of the Hudson River. She suffered from poor health.

Career
She began publishing in 1831, over the signature of "Stella". In 1834, she removed with her parents to Channahon, Will County, Illinois. For several years, she was a contributor to the New Yorker, and later, frequently wrote for the New-York Tribune. Greeley once made her an offer for the manuscript volume, which was declined. Elizabeth was Greeley's first love, but her father strongly opposed the match, insisting that his daughter should marry Walter S. Eames, a rich man, in preference to a poor printer.

In February 1837, she married Walter S. Eames (1805-1851), an Illinois farmer. They removed to New Hartford, New York near Utica, where he was engaged in mercantile business. Their children were, William L. (1838–1868), Albertine (1840–1872), Fannie S. (b. 1842), and Charles E. (b. 1844). After her marriage, she signed her writings, "Mrs. E. J. Eames". Greeley retained a warm regard for Eames even after her marriage.

Eames was the friend and contemporary of Margaret Fuller at the time when Fuller had charge of the literary department of the New-York Tribune. Eames' poetry especially attracted the attention of Edgar Allan Poe, who also was struck with her beauty and charm. Eames' more carefully finished poems appeared in Graham's Magazine and the Southern Literary Messenger. Many of her poems were published in a volume issued just before her death.

Later life
Mr. Eames drowned in the Hudson River in September 1851. Mrs. Eames died at of consumption in Channahon, Illinois, November 1856. Her papers passed into the possession of her children.

Critical reception
Rufus Wilmot Griswold, in his Female Poets of America, said of Eames:— "She writes with feeling, but she regards poetry as an art, and to the cultivation of it she brings her best powers. While thoughtful and earnest, therefore, her pieces are for the most part distinguished for a tasteful elegance." He selected for publication "The Crowning of Petrarch", "The Death of Pan", "Cleopatra", the "Sonnets" to Milton, Dryden, Addison, and Tasso, and a few other of her productions.

Selected works

 The Lost Shell Ballad

Notes

References

Attribution
 
 
 
 
 
 

1813 births
1856 deaths
19th-century American poets
19th-century American women writers
19th-century pseudonymous writers
19th-century deaths from tuberculosis
American women poets
American lyricists
Pseudonymous women writers
Tuberculosis deaths in Illinois